Fire-King is an Anchor Hocking brand of glassware similar to Pyrex. It was formerly made of low expansion borosilicate glass and ideal for oven use. Currently it is made of tempered soda-lime-silicate glass.

History
Fire-King was originally produced in the 1940s for everyday use, rather than display.  It was often sold in bags of flour as a promotional item or was given away at gas stations.  Fire-King could also be purchased at local grocery and hardware stores.    Several varieties of Fire-King dishes were made; nesting bowls, dessert bowls, glass beverage containers, casserole dishes, mugs and more. The vintage nesting bowls, produced by the Anchor Hocking Company, are one of the most sought after collectible dishes of this type.

Products
The Fire-King line includes bowls, casseroles, cups, plates, serving platters, creamers, vases and more. Fire-King is not designed for dishwasher use, which can dull its original lustre and remove any applied paint decorations.

Patterns and colors
There are many decalled patterns that are very popular including Blue Mosaic, Wheat, Primrose, Fleurette, Forget Me Not and Anniversary Rose. Patterns with solid glass colors are Swirl/Shell (1965–76), Sheaves of Wheat (Laurel 1952-63), Kimberly Diamond, Jane Ray, Alice, Fish Scale, Three Bands (1952–56) Restaurant Ware, 4000 Line and 1700 Line.

Jade-ite Restaurant Ware is most popular among some collectors.  It is a creamy jade color.  Martha Stewart popularized this pattern by using it on her TV show. In 2000 Fire-King was re-released by Anchor Hocking in Jade-ite. The pieces have been made from new molds and are not the same as the older Fire-King items. They are also stamped "Fire-King, 2000."

Excellent reference books on the subject are:
Anchor Hocking's Fireking and More by Gene Florence. 
A Collector's Guide to Anchor Hocking's Fire King Glassware, by Garry and Dale Kilgo and Jerry and Gail Wilkins
 
Fire-King solid glass colors come in jade-ite, burgundy, rose-ite (creamy pink)(not to be confused with “pink swirl” which is a pink fired on colour over opaque white glass), turquoise blue, azur-ite (light pale blue), white, ivory-white and ivory.  It can also be a fired-on coating over crystal in shades of pastel green, pastel blue, pastel peach, pastel yellow, primary orange, primary blue, primary yellow and primary green.  These fired on colors are part of the pattern Rainbow. Rainbow is not technically Fire-King, but included in the same category with most collector books. There are also some fired on Lustre color finishes that comes in several patterns and a few colours (on dinnerware) grey, white, pink and the most commonly found Peach Lustre.  There is also a bakeware set and mixing bowl set in “copper tint” fired on colour (over white opaque glass) which looks very similar to peach lustre, but is just a little more subtle in its shade of copper.

References

Further reading

 Clements, Monica Lynn, and Patricia Rosser Clements. An Unauthorized Guide to Fire-King Glasswares. A Schiffer book for collectors. Atglen, PA: Schiffer Pub. Ltd, 1999. 
 Florence, Gene. Anchor Hocking's Fire-King & More Identification & Value Guide, Including Early American Prescut and Wexford. Paducah, Ky: Collector Books, 2000. 
 Hopper, Philip. Anchor Hocking Decorated Pitcher[S] and Glasses The Fire King Years. A Schiffer book for collectors. Atglen, PA: Schiffer Pub, 2002. 
 Keller, Joe, and David Ross. Fire-King An Information and Price Guide. A Schiffer book for collectors. Atglen, PA: Schiffer Pub, 2002. 
 Kilgo, Garry. A Collector's Guide to Anchor Hocking's "Fire-King" Glassware. Addison, Ala. (P.O. Box 473, Addison 35540): K & W Collectibles, 1991.
 Tvorak, April M., and Matthew R. Terry. History and Price Guide to Fire-King. Canon City, Co: VAL Enterprises, 1992.

See also
 Pyrex

American brands
Glass trademarks and brands
Kitchenware brands
Products introduced in the 1940s